The National List of Threatened Terrestrial Fauna of the Philippines, also known as the Red List, is a list of endangered species endemic in the Philippines and is maintained by the Department of Environment and Natural Resources (DENR) through its Biodiversity Management Bureau and the Philippine Red List Committee. The list is pursuant to Republic Act No. 9147, or the Wildlife Resources Conservation and Protection Act. Species are assessed solely according to their population in the Philippines and hence may not be in line with other conversation lists such as the IUCN Red List which list the Crab-eating macaque (including subspecies the Philippine long-tailed macaque) as vulnerable but is not included in the 2019 release of the Philippines' national Red List.

The list was first released in 2004. In 2019, arachnids and insects were added to the list for the first time.

List

The following is the list of critically endangered (CR) and endangered (EN) species included in the National List of Threatened Terrestrial Fauna of the Philippines as per DENR Administrative Order 2019-09. The list below currently don't include fauna classified as vulnerable (VU) and other threatened species (OTS).

Mammals

Birds

Reptiles

Amphibians

Invertebrates

See also
List of threatened species of the Philippines, as listed by the International Union for Conservation of Nature

References

Lists of endangered animals
Lists of biota of the Philippines
2004 introductions
Nature conservation in the Philippines
Department of Environment and Natural Resources (Philippines)